A young carer is a young person who cares, unpaid, for a person who has any type of physical or mental illness, physical and/or mental disability or misuses substances such as alcohol or drugs. The age of a young carer varies between countries. For example, in Australia a young carer is a person under the age of 25 years old, while in the United Kingdom it is under 18.

The role of young carers
 
The roles taken on by a young carer are exhaustive and are carried out often behind closed doors on top of the normal pressures of a young persons life. The care they give may be practical, physical, and emotional. Responsibilities may range from providing practical support such as helping to cook, clean or wash, giving personal care, emotional support, providing medication or helping with financial chores.

Who young carers care for
The person they care for may be a parent, a partner, their own child, a sibling, another family member, a friend or someone who does not necessarily live in the same house as them.

Support for young carers
There are support programs to assist young carers both emotionally and financially with day-to-day tasks and making decisions. These programs offer face-to-face counselling, online programs, and phone helplines.

Australia
There are estimated to be around 272,000 young carers in Australia.

Little Dreamers Australia is Australia's leading Young Carer organisation, and is an independent not-for-profit that supports Young Carers across Australia.

Each Australian state and territory has a carer association that assists unpaid young carers and can be reached on 1800 242 636. The Young Carers Network is a national website that provides young carers with information on their local support services, helpful resources and a platform to share their story and opinions.

United Kingdom
According to the Carers Trust, in 2016 there were around 700,000 young carers in the UK which is approximately 1 in every 12 teenagers and around 2 in every classroom. Some support programmes for young carers have been cut due to austerity.  The amount of support young carers get varies from area to area and is subject to a postcode lottery.

See also
 Caregiver

References

Further reading

External links
http://www.youngcarersnetwork.com.au/ - A place for young carers to learn about their local support services in Australia
https://www.childrenssociety.org.uk/information/young-people/young-carers - Young Carers in the UK
Young Carers Research Group, Loughborough University, UK
http://www.youngcarers.net/ - Young Carers Chat 
http://www.ycptoronto.com/ - Young Carers Program in Canada
www.superhands.at- Support of Young Carers in Austria
https://www.young-carers.ch - Support of Young Carers in Switzerland
https://www.northamptonshire-carers.org/young-carers - Northamptonshire Young Carers, an example of a social group for Young Carers.

Health care occupations
Caregiving